Je me souviens is a 2009 French-Canadian (Quebec) film written and directed by André Forcier and produced by Les Films du Paria.

The film is set in 1949, when Maurice Duplessis was premier of Quebec and in the context of a union election in the Abitibi region.

References

External links
Official site

2009 films
Films set in Abitibi-Témiscamingue
Films shot in Quebec
Films directed by André Forcier
Films set in 1949
Canadian drama films
French-language Canadian films
2000s Canadian films